Inger Thorngren (born 7 July 1943) is a Swedish former freestyle swimmer. She competed in two events at the 1960 Summer Olympics.

References

External links
 

1943 births
Living people
Swedish female freestyle swimmers
Olympic swimmers of Sweden
Swimmers at the 1960 Summer Olympics
Sportspeople from Uppsala